Predrag Fred Matić (born 2 June 1962) is a Croatian centre-left politician of the Social Democratic Party who has been serving as a Member of European Parliament since 2019. He previously served as Minister of Veterans' Affairs from 2011 to 2016, in the Cabinet of Zoran Milanović.

Early life
Matić was born in 1962 in Požega, Croatia. He attended University of Osijek from which he graduated with a B.A. in education.

Military career
During the summer of 1991, Matić served in Croatian Armed Forces as one of the defenders of Trpinjska Street in Vukovar, during the Vukovar massacre. He was arrested in November 1991 and throughout nine months was exposed to almost daily torture in Serbian concentration camps. In summer 1992 he was released, and for his bravery and heroism was awarded with numerous medals and military decorations, followed by a discharge with a rank on brigadier of Croatian Army.

Political career

Career in national politics
After the war, Matić worked in the Cabinet of the Chief of the General Staff of the Armed Forces of the Republic of Croatia and held the post of Chief and Spokesman of General Affairs at its Office from 1994 to 1998. From 1998 to 2000 he was the head of the Ministry of Croatian Veterans and from 2004 to 2005 served as an advisor to Deputy Prime Minister Jadranka Kosor.

From 2008 to 2009 Matić served as a member of Croatian Parliament and until 2010 served as a member of the management board of Croatian Transparency. From 2010 to 2011 he served as Special Advisor to the President of Croatia Ivo Josipović. Following it, he assumed the role of Minister of Defence of Croatia on which he remained until 2016, and same year served as a member of the SDP General Board.

On 28 December 2015 Matić was elected as an MP and represented Social Democratic Party of Croatia from the 5th constituency. On that same day, his candidacy was suspended, and Biljana Gaća was elected instead. He ran again, this time during the 2016 campaign, assuming office until 14 October, but was dropped in January of that year. After his candidacy was dropped, he served as a member of Defence Committee, Gender Equality Committee and the National Security Council. 

In addition to his committee assignments, Matić held the post of a Deputy Member of the Croatian delegation to the Parliamentary Assembly of the South-East European Cooperation Process and was also a member of the Interparliamentary Co-operation Committee.

On 14 October 2016, Matić was elected back into an MP, using "Predrag" as his personal name. On 1 March 2019, he changed his name to "Predrag Fred" Matić following his reelection. During those years, since November 2016, he was a head of the Delegation to the Parliamentary Assembly of the South-East European Cooperation Process and was a member of the Interparliamentary Co-operation Committee.

Member of the European Parliament, 2019–present
Matić has been a Member of the European Parliament since the 2019 elections. In parliament, he has since been serving on the Committee on Fisheries and on the Committee on Culture and Education. He is an alternate member of the Committee on Women's Rights and Gender Equality, where he serves as the parliament's rapporteur on sexual and reproductive health and rights in the EU.

In addition to his committee assignments, Matić is part of the Parliament's delegation for relations with the Arab Peninsula.

Political positions
In 2018, Matić commented on Aleksandar Vučić's statement that Croatia wanted a country without Serbs, comparing it to Adolf Hitler's comments on how he wanted Germany without Jews.

References

1962 births
Living people
Social Democratic Party of Croatia politicians
People from Požega, Croatia
University of Osijek alumni
MEPs for Croatia 2019–2024
Order of Duke Domagoj recipients
Order of Nikola Šubić Zrinski recipients
Military personnel of the Croatian War of Independence